Plastic Eaters are a punk rock group formed in 1996 by English musician Stan Stammers and vocalist Rob Daly. Stammers was formerly bass player with Theatre of Hate and later Spear of Destiny. Originally hailing from Philadelphia, the band are now based in New York.

Between 1996 and 2004, Plastic Eaters regularly played in Philadelphia, New York City and New Jersey, and occasionally in Los Angeles. They also produced and remixed for other artists too, which include Pretty Poison, Josh Wink, Ani DiFranco, D Generation, Rocket from the Crypt and Incognegro.

After the release of a few EPs and the 2001 live album Live at the Uptown through their own website, the band's newer material returned to a more old school punk sound. The band have yet to release material in the UK.

In December 2008, Plastic Eaters released a cover of the Slade hit "Merry X-Mas Everybody" with the track "Going on a Mission", as a digital download only released through iTunes and 7digital. In 2010, Chuck Treece joined as the drummer.

In 2011, Stammers and Daly started writing soundtracks for US TV, film and adverts under the name Plastic Eater Sound, which is also the name of their record label.

Discography

Albums
Live at the Uptown (2001)
OK... Call It a Comeback (2012)

Singles
"Six Gun" 12"  (1997)
Plastic Eaters EP (1997)
Get On EP (1998)
"Merry X-Mas Everybody" (2008)
The Giggies & Piggies Extended Play (currently unreleased)

DVD
.357-11 (2010)

References

External links
 Plastic Eaters official site

Musical groups established in 1996
Punk rock groups from Pennsylvania
Musical groups from Philadelphia